The regions of Italy are the first-level administrative divisions of the Italian Republic, constituting its second NUTS administrative level. There are twenty regions, five of which have higher autonomy than the rest. Under the Constitution of Italy, each region is an autonomous entity with defined powers. With the exception of the Aosta Valley (since 1945) and Friuli Venezia Giulia (since 2018), each region is divided into a number of provinces.

History
During the Kingdom of Italy, regions were mere statistical districts of the central state. Under the Republic, they were granted a measure of political autonomy by the 1948 Italian Constitution. The original draft list comprised the Salento region (which was eventually included in Apulia); Friuli and Venezia Giulia were separate regions, and Basilicata was named Lucania. Abruzzo and Molise were identified as separate regions in the first draft, but were later merged into Abruzzi e Molise in the final constitution of 1948, before being separated in 1963.

Implementation of regional autonomy was postponed until the first Regional elections of 1970. The ruling Christian Democracy party did not want the opposition Italian Communist Party to gain power in the regions where it was historically rooted (the red belt of Emilia-Romagna, Tuscany, Umbria and the Marches).

Regions acquired a significant level of autonomy following a constitutional reform in 2001 (brought about by a centre-left government and confirmed by popular referendum), which granted them residual policy competence. A further federalist reform was proposed by the regionalist party Lega Nord and in 2005, the centre-right government led by Silvio Berlusconi proposed a new reform that would have greatly increased the power of regions.

The proposals, which had been particularly associated with Lega Nord, and seen by some as leading the way to a federal state, were rejected in the 2006 Italian constitutional referendum by 61.7% to 38.3%. The results varied considerably among the regions, ranging from 55.3% in favour in Veneto to 82% against in Calabria.

Political control

Number of regions governed by each coalition since 1995:

Regions

Macroregions
Macroregions are the first-level NUTS of the European Union.(it)

Status

Every region has a statute that serves as a regional constitution, determining the form of government and the fundamental principles of the organization and the functioning of the region, as prescribed by the Constitution of Italy (Article 123). Although all the regions except Tuscany define themselves in various ways as an "autonomous Region" in the first article of their Statutes, fifteen regions have ordinary statutes and five have special statutes, granting them extended autonomy.

Regions with ordinary statute
These regions, whose statutes are approved by their regional councils, were created in 1970, even though the Italian Constitution dates back to 1948. Since the constitutional reform of 2001 they have had residual legislative powers: the regions have exclusive legislative power with respect to any matters not expressly reserved to state law (Article 117). Yet their financial autonomy is quite modest: they keep just 20% of all levied taxes, mostly used to finance the region-based healthcare system.

Autonomous regions with special statute
Article 116 of the Italian Constitution grants home rule to five regions, namely the Aosta Valley, Friuli-Venezia Giulia, Sardinia, Sicily, and Trentino-Alto Adige/Südtirol, allowing them some legislative, administrative and financial power to a varying extent, depending on their specific statute. These regions became autonomous in order to take into account cultural differences and protect linguistic minorities. Moreover, the government wanted to prevent them from potentially seceding or being taken away from Italy after the defeat in World War II.

Institutions
Each region has an elected parliament, called Consiglio Regionale (regional council), or Assemblea Regionale (regional assembly) in Sicily, and a government called Giunta Regionale (regional committee), headed by a governor called Presidente della Giunta Regionale (president of the regional committee) or Presidente della Regione (regional president). The latter is directly elected by the citizens of each region, with the exceptions of Aosta Valley and Trentino-Alto Adige/Südtirol regions where the president is chosen by the regional council.

Under the 1995 electoral law, the winning coalition receives an absolute majority of seats on the council. The president chairs the giunta, and nominates or dismisses its members, called assessori. If the directly elected president resigns, new elections are called immediately.

In the Trentino-Alto Adige/Südtirol region, the regional council is made up of the joint session of the two provincial councils of Trentino and of South Tyrol. The regional president is one of the two provincial commissioners.

Representation in the Senate

Article 57 of the Constitution of Italy originally established that the Senate of the Republic was to be elected on a regional basis by Italian citizens aged 25 or older (unlike the Chamber of the Deputies, which was elected on a national basis and by all Italian citizens aged 18 or older). No region could have less than 7 senators, except for the two smallest regions: Aosta Valley (1 senator) and Molise (2 senators). From 2006 to 2020, 6 out of 315 senators (and 12 out of 630 deputies) were elected by Italians residing abroad.

After two constitutional amendments were passed respectively in 2020 (by constitutional referendum) and 2021, however, there have been changes. The Senate is still elected on a regional basis, but the number of senators was reduced from 315 to 200, who are now elected by all citizens aged 18 or older, just like deputies (themselves being reduced from 630 to 400). Italians residing abroad now elect 4 senators (and 8 deputies).

The remaining 196 senators are assigned to each region proportionally according to their population. The amended Article 57 of the Constitution provides that no region can have fewer than 3 senators representing it, barring Aosta Valley and Molise, which retained 1 and 2 senators respectively.

Economy of regions and macroregions

See also

 Italian NUTS level 1 regions
 Regional Council (Italy)
 Presidents of Regions of Italy
List of Italian regions by GDP
List of Italian regions by GRP per capita
 List of Italian regions by Human Development Index
 Flags of regions of Italy
 ISO 3166-2:IT

Other administrative divisions
 Provinces of Italy
 Metropolitan cities of Italy
 Municipalities of Italy

References

External links

 CityMayors article
 Regional Governments of Italy on Italia.gov.it
 Regional Governments of Italy on Governo.it

 
Subdivisions of Italy
Ranked lists of country subdivisions
Lists of subdivisions of Italy
Italy 1
Regions, Italy